Zirconia alumina is commonly used as a sand-blasting medium. It is typically used as an abrasive in casting and foundry processes. Zirconia alumina is a mixture of zirconium dioxide and aluminium oxide.
Zirconia toughened alumina typically consists of alumina with a 10 to 20 percent zirconia concentration, which enhances the toughness of the alumina. To achieve the increase in the composite's strength, a process known as stress induced transformation toughening takes place. Stress induced transformation toughening results in uniform internal strain, which causes the zirconia structure to crack, and the zirconia particles to switch phases. Because of this phase switch, the amount of zirconia particles increases and creates stresses within the alumina's structure. These stresses effectively heal the crack and block further cracking—the added zirconia doubles the composite's strength and enhances toughness between two and four times.

See also
Zirconia Toughened Alumina

References

Abrasives